John Joseph McCartin (born 24 April 1939) is a former Irish Fine Gael politician who served as a Member of the European Parliament (MEP) for the Connacht–Ulster constituency from 1979 to 2004. He served as a Teachta Dála (TD) for the Sligo–Leitrim constituency from 1981 to 1982 and 1982 to 1987. He also served as a Senator for the Agricultural Panel from 1973 to 1981.

Early life
He was born at Aughnasheelan, Ballinamore, County Leitrim, the son of small farmer Francis McCartin and his wife Annie Kate Lohan. He was educated at Drumbibe National School, Aughnasheelan and St. Patrick's College, Cavan. In 1972, he married Ann Clarke; they have two sons. As a young farmer, McCartin was awarded many national prizes for progressive and efficient farming. He founded the McCartin Bros group of companies with his brother Tommy; these had interests in Structural Steel, Clothing Manufacture, Milling, Forestry, Pig Production, and Dairy/Beef Farming. They quickly became the largest employers in Leitrim.

Political career
McCartin joined Fine Gael as a teenager and became secretary of the Ballinamore District Executive at the age of seventeen. He served as county secretary of Macra na Feirme (Young Farmers Organisation) and was a member of its national executive. He was Chairman of the fundraising committee which established the first rehabilitation centre in the north-west of Ireland. He was elected to Leitrim County Council in 1967. In 1973, he was elected to Seanad Éireann as a Senator for the Agricultural Panel, and after his re-election to the Seanad in 1977 he was elected Leas-Chathaoirleach of the 14th Seanad.

He was elected to the European Parliament in 1979 for the Connacht–Ulster constituency and to the Dáil at the 1981 general election representing the Sligo–Leitrim constituency. He served as secretary of the Fine Gael Parliamentary Party, Secretary of the Opposition Front bench and party Spokesperson for Agriculture. He lost his seat at the February 1982 general election but regained it at the November 1982 general election. He lost it at the subsequent 1987 general election and did not stand in any further Dáil elections.

In the European Parliament, McCartin was elected Vice Chairman of the Parliament's Budgetary Control Committee. He was the first Irish person ever to hold the position of Vice President of the European People's Party. He also served on the parliament's Agriculture and Fisheries committees. He was Joint Auditor of the European People's Party, along with former Taoiseach John Bruton. He retired from the European Parliament in 2004, having become Ireland's longest-ever serving MEP.

In 1974, he was elected Leitrim Person of the Year. In 1977, he was named as one of Ireland's "People of the Year" for "bringing hope to a depressed area."

In 2004, he was presented with the Schuman Medal at a meeting of the European Christian Democrats in Budapest, Hungary, for "his outstanding contribution to peace and unity in Europe and for the promotion of the human values of mankind".

References

External links

1939 births
Living people
Members of the 13th Seanad
Members of the 14th Seanad
Members of the 22nd Dáil
Members of the 24th Dáil
Local councillors in County Leitrim
Fine Gael MEPs
MEPs for the Republic of Ireland 1999–2004
MEPs for the Republic of Ireland 1994–1999
MEPs for the Republic of Ireland 1989–1994
MEPs for the Republic of Ireland 1984–1989
MEPs for the Republic of Ireland 1979–1984
Fine Gael TDs
Fine Gael senators